"Dance Dance Dance" is a song by English musician James Cottriall. It was released in Austria as a digital download on 12 April 2013 as the lead single from his third studio album Common Ground. It entered the Austrian Singles Chart at number 22.

Track listing
 Digital download
 "Dance Dance Dance" - 3:16

Chart performance
On 26 April 2013 the song entered the Austrian Singles Chart at number 22.

Weekly charts

Release history

References

2013 singles
James Cottriall songs
2013 songs